Kompressor or KOMPRESSOR may refer to:

Kompressor (musician), a parody industrial hip hop act (2000–2005)
Kompressor (Mercedes-Benz), a supercharger option on cars
Kleemann Kompressor, an aftermarket automotive accessory, an integrated supercharger-intercooler-intake manifold, built by Kleemann
Der Kompressor (book), a 1983 automotive book by Michael Wolff Metternich

See also

Turbocharger (turbine-powered supercharger, turbosupercharger), an exhaust-driven engine air compressor, forced air induction
Supercharger, a power-driven engine air compressor, forced air induction

Compressor (disambiguation)